= Constituency RSM-168 =

Reserved constituency of the Provincial Assembly of Sindh, Pakistan

RSM-168
- Provincial Reserved constituency for the Provincial Assembly of Sindh

Current constituency

RSM-168 is a reserved Constituency of the Provincial Assembly of Sindh.

== See also ==
- Sindh
